El Decameron Negro may refer to:

 El Decamerón Negro, a 1981 solo guitar work by Leo Brouwer
 El Decameron Negro, a 1997 album by Michael Tröster
 Latin American Guitar Music 'El Decameron Negro''', a 1993 album by Evangelos & Liza

See alsoThe Black Decameron (Italian: Il decamerone nero''), a 1972 Italian costume drama comedy film